Missulena tussulena is a species of mygalomorph spiders in the family Actinopodidae. It is found in Chile.

References

tussulena
Spiders described in 1994
Endemic fauna of Chile